The wine industry of Ukraine is well-established with long traditions. Several brands of wine from Ukraine are exported to bordering countries, the European Union, and North America.

The regions of wine industry in Ukraine corresponds to its viticulture regions situated predominantly in close vicinity to Black Sea coast in Southern Ukraine as well as around Tisza valley of Zakarpattia Oblast.

History

A wine culture existed in today's Ukraine already in the 4th century BC at the south coast of the Crimea. Presses and amphoras were found from this period. Wine cultivation in the northern part of the country (around Kyiv and Chernihiv) however only started in the 11th century by monks.

Under Empress Catherine the Great (1729–1796) in 1783 the Crimea became a part of the Russian Empire. Count Mikhail Vorontsov planted the first wine gardens in 1820 and established a large winery near Yalta. The viticulture research institute Magarach was founded then in 1828. In 1822, with the approval of Tsar Alexander I, Swiss winegrowers from the canton Vaud established a colony at Shabo (French: Chabag). They later founded daughter colonies on the Dnieper and in Crimea. Wine from Chabag was displayed at the 1893 World's Columbian Exposition in Chicago and received a medal of recognition.

The founder of the famous sparkling wines is prince Lev Golitsyn, who for the first time manufactured Russian “Champagner” after the Crimean War (1854 to 1856) on his property Novyi Svet near Yalta. Later, under the last Tsar Nicholas II (1868–1918) the predecessor of Massandra, today's state winery, was founded. Since 2000 the production as well as the export of the wines has increased rapidly.

After the annexation of Crimea, Ukraine lost not only 17 thousand hectares of vineyards, but also wineries that provided 60% of wines.

Main vine-growing regions

 Southern Ukraine: Mykolaiv, Kherson, Dnipropetrovsk, and Odessa Oblasts as well as such regions like Crimea (Balaklava, Massandra) and Bessarabia (Budjak)
 Zakarpattia Oblast (Carpathian Ruthenia)
 Varietals

The main varietals are Aligoté, Muscat, Isabella, Traminer, Cabernet Sauvignon, Chardonnay, Pinot noir, Pinot gris, Rkatsiteli.

Sparkling wines 
Production of sparkling wine like Sovetskoye Shampanskoye ('Soviet Champagne') is increasing. Most of the sparkling wine is produced around large cities like Kyiv, Bakhmut, Lviv, Odessa and Kharkiv. Most of the production is based on Pinot blanc, Aligoté, Riesling and Feteasca.

Special wineries 
 Magarach Wine Institute near Yalta with possibility to sample some of their 20,000 different wines derived from 3,200 vine species.
 Winery Massandra.

See also
 Konstantin Frank, a notable Ukrainian-American viticulturist and winemaker, who was responsible for developing the thriving viticulture and wine industry of New York State, using his experience of growing the European Vitis vinifera varietals in the colder climate of Ukraine.
 John Worontshak

Notes

References 
 Weinbau in der Ukraine: Stand und Perspektiven, Business Guide Deutschland Ukraine 2011, author: Wellem Bougie
 Der ukrainische Weinmarkt birgt ein enormes Wachstumspotential, UKRAINEaktuell 12-2010, author: Wellem Bougie

 
Economy of Ukraine
Science and technology in Ukraine
Tourism in Ukraine
Agriculture in Ukraine